Christina Obergföll (born 22 August 1981) is a retired German track and field athlete who competed in the javelin throw. She was World Champion in 2013. Her personal best throw of 70.20 m is the German record. It also ranks her fifth on the overall list.

Career 
At the 2005 World Championships in Athletics, Obergföll won the silver medal with a European record (70.03m) by finishing second behind Osleidys Menéndez, who set a new world record at the same event.

Obergföll finished 4th at the 2006 European Athletics Championships in Gothenburg.

With 70.20m, she improved her own European record at the European Cup Super League meeting in Munich on 23 June 2007.

At the 2008 Summer Olympics, she won the silver medal, but lost the European record to Barbora Špotáková.

At the 2012 Olympics in London, she repeated her greatest success, when she won a silver medal.

At the 2013 World Championships in Athletics, which was held in Moscow, Russia, Obergföll got the gold with a mark of 69.05 meters, reaching the success that she was always fighting for. Also in 2013, she married Boris Henry.

Obergföll took 2014 off due to being pregnant, but returned for the 2015 World Championships, where she finished fourth. In 2016, she finished eight at the Olympic Games and retired thereafter.

Competition record

References

External links 
 
 
 
 
 
 
 
 

1981 births
Living people
People from Lahr
Sportspeople from Freiburg (region)
German female javelin throwers
German national athletics champions
Olympic athletes of Germany
Athletes (track and field) at the 2004 Summer Olympics
Athletes (track and field) at the 2008 Summer Olympics
Athletes (track and field) at the 2012 Summer Olympics
Athletes (track and field) at the 2016 Summer Olympics
Olympic bronze medalists for Germany
Olympic silver medalists for Germany
World Athletics Championships medalists
European Athletics Championships medalists
Medalists at the 2012 Summer Olympics
Medalists at the 2008 Summer Olympics
World Athletics Championships athletes for Germany
Olympic silver medalists in athletics (track and field)
Olympic bronze medalists in athletics (track and field)
Diamond League winners
World Athletics Championships winners